Moyuta is a town and municipality in the Jutiapa department of Guatemala.

Topography

Administrative division 
The municipality has 54 villages and 30 settlements, and it annual fair takes place between 10 and 15 March.

Education

Climate 

Moyuta has a tropical savanna climate (Köppen: Aw).

Geographic location 

Moyuta has an area of 380 km² and is located at 1.283 m above sea level.

See also

Notes and references

References

Bibliography 

 
 
 
 
 

Municipalities of the Jutiapa Department